Toyota Technological Institute at Chicago (TTIC or TTI-Chicago) is a private graduate college and research institute focused on computer science and located in Chicago, Illinois within the University of Chicago campus. It is supported by the earnings on an endowment of approximately $255 million as well as by the income from research awards received by its faculty.

History
TTIC was founded by the Toyota Technological Institute (TTI), in Nagoya in Japan, a small private engineering school with an endowment provided by the Toyota Motor Corporation. TTI established TTIC as an independent computer science institute with the intention of creating a world-class institution. In addition to historical ties, there remains active collaboration between TTIC and TTI in Nagoya. However, TTIC has no formal ties with either TTI or the Toyota Motor Corporation.

TTIC officially opened for operation in September 2003 and three students entered its Ph.D. program in September 2004.

Academics

Research
TTIC focuses primarily on the following areas within computer science:
 Machine learning
 Theoretical Computer Science—Algorithms & Complexity
 Computer Vision
 Speech and Language Technologies
 Computational Biology
 Robotics

PhD program
TTIC offers a graduate program leading to a doctorate in computer science, with graduate students conducting research primarily within its areas of focus. 
TTIC has degree granting authority in the State of Illinois and is Accredited by The Higher Learning Commission of the North Central Association of Colleges and Schools.

Relationship with University of Chicago

TTIC is located on the University of Chicago campus and has a close relationship with the University of Chicago Computer Science Department. An agreement between the University of Chicago and TTIC allows cross-listing of computer science course offerings between the two institutions, providing students from each institution the opportunity to register in the other's courses. Faculty and students enjoy full privileges of the University library system, athletic facilities and other services.

References

External links
 

Educational institutions established in 2003
Graduate schools in the United States
Toyota Technological Institute at Chicago
University of Chicago
Toyota
Private universities and colleges in Illinois
2003 establishments in Illinois